Sarah Beth Briggs (born 2 June 1972, Newcastle upon Tyne, England) is a British classical pianist.

Briggs was a finalist in the BBC Young Musician competition at the age of 11 in 1984 and one of the youngest recipients of a Dame Myra Hess Award at the same age. She was joint winner of the International Mozart Competition in Salzburg at the age of 15. She studied in Newcastle, York and Birmingham with Denis Matthews, in Switzerland with one of Claudio Arrau's most renowned students, Edith Fischer and, through a Hindemith Foundation chamber scholarship, with Bruno Giuranna.

A soloist and chamber musician, she has broadcast, performed live and given masterclasses in the UK, around Europe and the US and has worked with many international orchestras including the Hallé, London Mozart Players, London Philharmonic, English Chamber Orchestra, Scottish Chamber Orchestra, Ulster Orchestra, Royal Philharmonic, Manchester Camerata, Royal Liverpool Philharmonic, BBC Concert Orchestra, Royal Northern Sinfonia, and the Vienna Chamber Orchestra. She was a founder member of Trio Melzi (2000 -2016). In addition to her  piano duet venture with James Lisney, she now leads three chamber groups: Anton Stadler Trio (with clarinettist Janet Hilton and violist Robin Ireland), Clarion³ (with Janet Hilton and bassoonist Laurence Perkins), and a duo with Janet Hilton. She also taught keyboard at the University of York.

She has recorded works by Bartók, Beethoven, Brahms, Britten (the world premiere of whose Three Character Pieces she gave in 1989), Chopin, Debussy, Haydn, Mozart, Schubert and Rawsthorne on the Semaphore label. In May 2016, Briggs released her first concerto CD on the AVIE Records label featuring the world premiere recording of Hans Gál's Piano Concerto and Mozart Concerto in E flat, K482 with the Royal Northern Sinfonia and Kenneth Woods.

Discography
Sarah Beth Briggs Plays Haydn, Mozart, Bartok, Brahms and Chopin SML MP14
Sarah Beth Briggs Plays Beethoven, Brahms, Rawsthorne and Britten SML MP21
Sarah Beth Briggs Plays Beethoven, Haydn and Mozart SML MP28
Sarah Beth Briggs Plays Mozart, Beethoven and Schubert SML MP35
Sarah Beth Briggs Plays Debussy and Chopin SML MP49 
Sarah Beth Briggs, Royal Northern Sinfonia and Kenneth Woods/Bradley Creswick. World premiere recording Hans Gál Piano Concerto and Mozart Concerto, K482. AV2358
Sarah Beth Briggs Briggs Piano Trio. Sarah Beth Briggs David Juritz Kenneth Woods. Gál & Shostakovich AV2390
Sarah Beth Briggs Schumann Papillons, Kinderszenen. Brahms opp 117 & 118 AV2398
Sarah Beth Briggs The Austrian Connection Haydn Mozart Schubert Gal AV2418
Sarah Beth Briggs Variations. Mozart Beethoven Mendelssohn Brahms AV2569

References

External links
Sarah Beth Briggs official website 
Sarah Beth Briggs on Youtube
Sarah Beth Briggs on Amazon
Gramophone review of Sarah Beth Briggs Schubert, Mozart and Beethoven

MusicWeb disc review2011
MusicWeb disc review 2013
Gramophone review Gál/ Mozart 2016
Lisney – Briggs Duo
Anton Stadler Trio
Clarion³
Briggs/Hilton duo

English classical pianists
Living people
1972 births
Musicians from Newcastle upon Tyne
20th-century classical pianists
20th-century British pianists
20th-century English women musicians
21st-century classical pianists
21st-century British pianists
21st-century English women musicians
20th-century women pianists
21st-century women pianists